Yaroslav Hrytsak (born 1 January 1960) is a Ukrainian historian, Doctor of Historical Sciences and professor of the Ukrainian Catholic University. Director of the Institute for Historical Studies of Ivan Franko National University of Lviv. Guest professor (1996-2009) at Central European University in Budapest; First Vice-President (1999-2005) of the International Association of Ukrainians. Chief editor of the scientific journal "Ukraine Modern". Member of the editorial board of the journals Ab Imperio, Critique, Slavic Review, and a member of the supervisory board of Harvard Ukrainian Studies. Honorary Professor of NaUKMA.

Education 
He gained his PhD in 1987 at University of Lviv. Hrytsak passed his habilitation in 1996. He has been director of the Institute for Historical Research, Ivan Franko National University of Lviv since 1992.

In 1998 he won an award of "Przegląd Wschodni" for the best foreign book on Eastern Europe. For his book about Ivan Franko he won the Antonovych prize for Intellectual Achievements and the "Best Book in Ukraine" from the leading Ukrainian magazine Кореспондент and the Jerzy Giedroyc Award (founded by Maria Curie-Skłodowska University) in 2014.

Books 
The Spirit that Moves to Battle... A political portrait of Ivan Franko (1856-1916) (Lviv, 1990, in Ukrainian)
Essays in Ukrainian History: Making of Modern Ukrainian Nation (Kyiv, 1996, in Ukrainian) (Polish translation: Historia Ukrainy 1772-1999. Narodziny nowoczesnego narodu)

See also
 Handbook on history of Ukraine

References

External links
Information on the website of CEU
Hrytsak's bibliography at chtyvo portal
Ya. Outline of History of Ukraine. Kiev: "Geneza", 1996; second edition in 2000.

Living people
1960 births
People from Lviv Oblast
20th-century Ukrainian historians
University of Lviv alumni
Institute of Ukrainian Archaeography alumni
Academic staff of Ukrainian Catholic University
Academic staff of Central European University
Historians of Ukraine
21st-century Ukrainian historians